Thyene similes is a jumping spider species in the genus Thyene. The male was first identified in 2002.

Distribution
Thyene similes has been found in the Socotra Archipelago off the coast of the Yemen.

References

Fauna of Socotra
Salticidae
Spiders described in 2002
Spiders of Asia
Taxa named by Wanda Wesołowska